Dorylaimus is a genus of Dorylaimidae.

The genus was described in 1845 by Félix Dujardin.

Species:
 Dorylaimus acutines
 Dorylaimus stagnalis

References

Nematodes